Dmitri Aleksandrovich Tsitsilin (born 24 October 1985) is a Russian professional football coach and a former player. He is the goalkeeping coach with FC Fakel-M Voronezh.

Club career
He made his Russian Football National League debut for FC Metallurg Krasnoyarsk on 16 September 2006 in a game against FC Oryol.

External links
 

1985 births
Footballers from Voronezh
Living people
Russian footballers
Association football goalkeepers
FC Tekstilshchik Kamyshin players
FC Rotor Volgograd players
FC Fakel Voronezh players
FC Salyut Belgorod players
FC Khimki players
FC Torpedo Moscow players
FC Novokuznetsk players
FC Yenisey Krasnoyarsk players
FC Chayka Peschanokopskoye players